Punta Palascia Lighthouse is an active lighthouse located in Capo d'Otranto, which is the easternmost point in Italy and the narrowest point of Strait of Otranto at the mouth of Adriatic Sea.

Description
The lighthouse was built in 1867 and abandoned in the 1970s, however, was reopened in 2008 and currently hosts the Centre on Environment and Health of the Mediterranean Ecosystems and a multimedia Museum of the Sea. The lighthouse is fully automated and is managed by the Marina Militare and is identified by the code number 1983 E.F.

The lighthouse is one of five Mediterranean lighthouses protected by the European Commission. It is open to guided tours for visitors, particularly at New Year, since it stands at the eastern point of Italy where the dawn of the New Year can be seen before the rest of the country.

See also
List of lighthouses in Italy
Capo d'Otranto

References

External links

 Servizio Fari Marina Militare

Lighthouses in Italy
Lighthouses completed in 1867
Buildings and structures in the Province of Lecce